Allan Fotheringham (August 31, 1932August 19, 2020) was a Canadian newspaper and magazine journalist.  He styled himself Dr. Foth and "the Great Gatheringfroth".  He was described as "never at a loss for words".

Early life
Fotheringham was born in Hearne, Saskatchewan, on August 31, 1932.  His father died from an appendectomy gone wrong when he was two, and his mother remarried, with Allan taking his stepfather's surname Fotheringham.  He attended Chilliwack Secondary School, where he was active in student leadership and wrote for the school's paper, as well as the Chilliwack Progress.  Upon graduation he studied English and political science at the University of British Columbia and worked at a variety of media outlets during his career.  He was best known as a columnist, originally at the Ubyssey, a student newspaper.  He was hired straight out of university by the Vancouver Sun during the heady times of the late 1960s, the final days of the old Bennett Socreds provincially and the advent of Pierre Trudeau federally. Fotheringham's columns and commentaries brought him national attention as well as wider syndication and a broader subject base. He was one of the leading specialists in explaining the world of British Columbia politics during his time at the Sun.

Career
Fotheringham wrote for Maclean's starting in October 1975. His column appeared on the back page of the magazine for 27 years, and was so widely read and so influential that he is said to have made Maclean's the magazine people read "from back to front".  Consequently, he dubbed a collection of them as "Last Page First". Some of his more memorable political nicknames include "the brogue that walks and talks like a man" (for Jack Webster) and its offspring, "the jaw that walks and talks like a man" (for Brian Mulroney).  He is credited with coining the terms "Natural Governing Party" for the federal Liberals, and the "Holy Mother Corporation" for the CBC in the course of writing his column.  His columns occasionally opened with the exclamation "Zowie, Dr. Foth!"

Fotheringham was a regular panelist for a decade in the latter years of the CBC Television program Front Page Challenge, having replaced the deceased Gordon Sinclair in 1984.  He also wrote columns for the Toronto Sun for fourteen years until 2000.  In 2001, Maclean's underwent an editorial revamp, and Fotheringham's column was moved to an inside page to make room for a guest column.  Soon afterward, Fotheringham left Maclean's, and became a columnist for The Globe and Mail.  He had a national syndicated column that was in 20 newspapers, but he retired from regular contributions in 2007, after life-threatening complications from a colonoscopy led to his hospitalization for five months.  Fotheringham continued to write occasionally for the Globe and for the National Post, as well as a Calgary magazine called The Roughneck.

Later years
Fotheringham had honorary degrees from the University of New Brunswick (2003) and the University of Saskatchewan (2005).  He died on August 19, 2020, at his home in Toronto.  He was 12 days short of his 88th birthday.  Although the cause of death has not yet been determined, his wife noted that he was in "generally poor health" in the time leading up to his death.

Controversies 
In a 1984 column, he wrote that two Vancouver lawyers were "cementing their connections through the tennis club circuits and the wife-swapping brigades". A judge awarded the lawyers $10,000 each in damages for libel.

In a 1988 article about the British explorer Sir Ranulph Fiennes, Bt, he wrote that "Prince Charles always supports him, claiming great results for British exports, but no one has ever been able to demonstrate that any scientific or historical benefits have resulted." A London jury awarded £75,000 in damages against Fotheringham and his publishers.

In 1987, Fotheringham quipped that the United States were not serious about free trade negotiations with Canada because its chief negotiator Peter Murphy had an inoperable brain tumor, which is alleged to have led to his dismissal from his Washington post with Southam News.

Fotheringham was repeatedly accused of plagiarism throughout his career. He told an interviewer that "I don’t think it’s all that serious" since "all journalism is based on basically what someone else has written or reported.".

Invented terms 

Affectionately known as "Foth" as well as "Dr. Foth", he dubbed himself "the Great Gatheringfroth", and coined some well-known terms in British Columbian political history:
 Lotusland – British Columbia, particularly Victoria
 the Granite Curtain – the Rocky Mountains
 the Tweed Curtain – the Oak Bay, British Columbia–Victoria border, referring to the former's conservative British character
 "the Brogue that walks and talks like a man" – journalist and broadcaster Jack Webster (who had many nicknames, not all of them Foth's).  Foth later adapted this phrase to "the Jaw that walks and talks like a man" for Brian Mulroney.
 the Natural Governing Party – the federal Liberals
 the Holy Mother Corporation – the CBC
 Jurassic Clark – Joe Clark
 "The only man in Canada who can't speak either of the two official languages" – Jean Chrétien
 Coma City – Ottawa
 Vancouver, the Narcissus of the West Coast

Quotes 

 "In the Maritimes, politics is a disease; in Quebec a religion; in Ontario a business; on the Prairies a protest; and in British Columbia an entertainment."  Malice in Blunderland (1982)
 "The Tories are like cream: rich, thick and full of clots."  Fotheringham quoting a Liberal Convention Delegate in LOOK MA...NO HANDS (1983)

Awards
Source:
 Southam Fellowship in Journalism, 1964
 National Magazine Award for Humor, 1980
 National Newspaper Award for Column Writing, 1980 (first recipient)
 Inducted into the Canadian News Hall of Fame, 1999
 Bruce Hutchinson Lifetime Achievement Award, 2002

Bibliography

See also
 List of newspaper columnists

References

Specific

General

External links
 
 Audio interview with Fotheringham on his memoir.

1932 births
2020 deaths
20th-century Canadian journalists
20th-century Canadian male writers
21st-century Canadian journalists
21st-century Canadian male writers
Canadian columnists
Canadian magazine journalists
Canadian political journalists
Maclean's writers and editors
The Globe and Mail columnists
University of British Columbia alumni
Vancouver Sun people
Writers from Saskatchewan